Best Of – Volume I is the first greatest hits album by American hard rock band Van Halen, released on October 22, 1996.

The album does not contain any songs from the band's 1982 album Diver Down. Best Of – Volume I also features "Humans Being", the band's contribution to the Twister soundtrack. The two newly recorded songs, "Can't Get This Stuff No More" and "Me Wise Magic", at the end of the album are with original lead vocalist David Lee Roth. These two songs were released as singles to promote this compilation. They are also the last songs recorded by the original Van Halen lineup of Eddie Van Halen, Alex Van Halen, Roth and Michael Anthony. The Van Halen brothers would not record again with Roth until the album A Different Kind of Truth, released in 2012. Anthony did not play with Van Halen again following the band's 2004 tour.

Initial pressings of the album contained an alternate edit of "Runnin' with the Devil" where the verses, chorus and solos were arranged in a different order than that of the original album version. It was reported that this was accidental and subsequent pressings have replaced this version with the one found on Van Halen. However, some radio stations still play this erroneous version of the song.

The album itself, while not controversial, sparked a great deal of in-band controversy because of the personnel issues surrounding the band at the time. Sammy Hagar, who by this time had been a member of Van Halen for eleven years, equal to the amount of time as the previous lead vocalist, David Lee Roth, left the band in June 1996 due to a number of unclear circumstances. Some sources reported that Hagar was dissatisfied with the decision to issue a "greatest hits" collection, and was instead more inclined to do an entirely new album of new material. In either case, it was announced that Hagar had left the band and they began working with David Lee Roth on new material for inclusion on the disc. This was not to last, as Roth and Eddie Van Halen clashed publicly and the band once again was without a lead singer, before hiring Gary Cherone. All songs except "Humans Being", "Can't Get This Stuff No More", and "Me Wise Magic" are included on the band's subsequent greatest hits album The Best of Both Worlds (2004).

Despite the aforementioned friction, the album went on to win Metal Edge magazine's 1996 Readers' Choice Award for "Best Hits or Compilation Album". Hagar shares the accolade with Roth, since the album features material from both singers. Also, the song "Humans Being" (featured on both the album and the Twister film soundtrack) was voted "Best Song from a Movie Soundtrack".

Track listing

Personnel
Van Halen

David Lee Roth – lead vocals (tracks 2–8, 16 & 17)
Sammy Hagar - lead vocals (tracks 9–15)
Eddie Van Halen - lead guitar, keyboards, backing vocals
Michael Anthony - bass, backing vocals
Alex Van Halen – drums, percussion

Production 

Glen Ballard – producer (tracks 16, 17)
Bruce Fairbairn – producer (tracks 14, 15)
Andy Johns – producer (tracks 12, 13)
Mick Jones – producer (tracks 9, 10)
Don Landee – engineer (tracks 1–11), producer (tracks 9–11)
Erwin Musper – engineer (track 15)
Ted Templeman – producer (tracks 1–8, 12, 13)
Van Halen – producer (tracks 9–13)

Charts

Weekly charts

Year-end charts

Certifications

References

Van Halen compilation albums
1996 greatest hits albums
Albums produced by Andy Johns
Albums produced by Bruce Fairbairn
Albums produced by Donn Landee
Albums produced by Glen Ballard
Albums produced by Mick Jones (Foreigner)
Albums produced by Ted Templeman
Warner Records compilation albums
Albums recorded at Sunset Sound Recorders